Medwin Biteghe(born 1 September 1996) is a Gabonese footballer who currently plays as a midfielder for Saudi Arabian club Al-Sahel.

Biteghé played for Cercle Mbéri Sportif in the 2015 Gabon Championnat National D1. He led the club to the semi-finals of the 2016 Coupe du Gabon Interclubs. On 29 June 2022, Biteghé joined Saudi Arabian club Al-Sahel.

Biteghe played for the Gabon national football team on November 11, 2017 against Mali in a qualifying match for the 2018 FIFA World Cup a 0-0 draw at home at the Stade de Franceville.

References

1996 births
Living people
Gabonese footballers
Gabon international footballers
Cercle Mbéri Sportif players
FK Utenis Utena players
US Tataouine players
Al-Adalah FC players
Al-Sahel SC (Saudi Arabia) players
Gabon Championnat National D1 players
Tunisian Ligue Professionnelle 1 players
Saudi Professional League players
Saudi First Division League players
Gabonese expatriate footballers
Expatriate footballers in Lithuania
Expatriate footballers in Tunisia
Expatriate footballers in Saudi Arabia
Gabonese expatriate sportspeople in Lithuania
Gabonese expatriate sportspeople in Tunisia
Gabonese expatriate sportspeople in Saudi Arabia
Association football midfielders
21st-century Gabonese people